Ectoedemia furcella is a moth of the family Nepticulidae. It was described by Scoble in 1983. It is known from South Africa (it was described from Transvaal).

The larvae feed on Diospyros lycioides lycioides.

References

Endemic moths of South Africa
Nepticulidae
Moths of Africa
Moths described in 1983
Taxa named by Malcolm Scoble